Radical 68 or radical dipper meaning "dipper" is one of the 34 Kangxi radicals (214 radicals in total) composed of 4 strokes.

In the Kangxi Dictionary, there are 32 characters (out of 49,030) to be found under this radical.

 is also the 96th indexing component in the Table of Indexing Chinese Character Components predominantly adopted by Simplified Chinese dictionaries published in mainland China.

 shìdǒu, sometimes represented by  dǒu alone, is also the symbol for a Chinese traditional measurement of dry volume equaling about 10 liters, which is ~18.16 pints, ~2.27 gallons, ~610.2 cubic inches, or ~0.3531 cubic feet.

Evolution

Derived characters

Literature

External links

Unihan Database - U+6597

068
096